Charles M. Thacker (1866 – 1918) was a justice of the Oklahoma Supreme Court from 1915 to 1918.

Biography
According to a genealogical posting, Charles M. Thacker was born January 17, 1866,  and raised on his father's farm in Brunswick County, Virginia. His mother taught him at home until he was seven years old, when he began attending school until he was past nineteen years old. The family was evidently very poor, since he interrupted his school for a time while he worked in a Petersburg wood yard, and for another period while in a country store.

Deciding that he would never make enough money in rural Virginia to marry and support a family, he decided to go west to seek his fortune and improve his health. He reportedly persuaded his parents to agree with his migrating to Texas to improve his health and welfare. His father gave him $75.00 to help him on his way.

Life in Texas
Thacker's first stop in Texas was in Ennis, where he managed to find work as a scribe and general helper for an elderly man who was researching what he called "lost titles" to Texas lands. This job lasted about a year, long enough for Thacker to realize that he would never earn enough money to return to Virginia to settle down. He decided to learn bookkeeping, so that he could at least support himself with a regular salary. He took a few courses, but seized an opportunity to work in a law office and learn the subject while doing work for the owners of the practice. After about one year of "reading the law," he was admitted to the bar on June 20, 1888, by the District Court in Dallas. He soon got a job with a bookkeeping firm, but the firm went out of business before even paying his first month's salary. Besides, his health was suffering, so Thacker decided to move to a higher altitude and drier climate in northwestern Texas. A friend gave him five dollars and some charitable lawyers gave him some old law books so he could make the journey.

After visiting several towns, Thacker moved to Mangum, then in Greer County, Texas, arriving on April 29, 1889. He was appointed as county attorney in August, 1889, then resigned to start publishing a newspaper, and was appointed as county judge on February 8, 1892.

Life in Oklahoma
Thomas H. Doyle, a member of the Oklahoma Supreme court and a former colleague of Judge Thacker, described Thacker's political history in his memorial. While old Greer County was still part of Texas, Thacker had already served as county attorney and county judge.Thacker had been elected to the "upper house of the Territorial Assembly" from the 13th District in 1898. He was then elected County Attorney and County Judge of Greer County, Oklahoma in 1900. He continued to  hold office by winning successive elections until Oklahoma attained statehood in 1907. During that time, he also served as a member of the board of regents of the territorial normal schools. He was elected as mayor of Mangum in 1909.

Thacker was appointed member-at-large to the Supreme Court Commission in March 1913. Governor Robert L. Williams appointed him  on November 1, 1915, to fill a vacancy on the court caused by the death of Justice G. A. Brown. In 1916, he was elected to succeed himself for a full 6-year term.

Death
Charles M. Thacker died in February, 1918, in an Oklahoma City hospital. His funeral was held February 20, 1918 in the Supreme Court chambers in the capitol. He had been ill for a week from inflammation of the pancreas, according to the Hollis Post Herald of Harmon  County, Oklahoma on February 21, 1918.

Notes

References

Justices of the Oklahoma Supreme Court
1866 births
1918 deaths
People from Brunswick County, Virginia
People from Ennis, Texas
People from Mangum, Oklahoma
People from Greer County, Oklahoma
U.S. state supreme court judges admitted to the practice of law by reading law
19th-century American judges